Shahriari or Shariyari or Shahryari may refer to:

Places
 Shahriari, Chaharmahal and Bakhtiari, Iran
 Shahriari, Nik Shahr, Sistan and Baluchestan province, Iran
 Shahriari, Zabol, Sistan and Baluchestan province, Iran
 Shahriari Rural District (Kuhrang County), Chaharmahal and Bakhtiari province, Iran
 Shahriari Rural District (Khatam County), Yazd province, Iran
 Shahriari-ye Olya, Yazd province, Iran
 Shahriari-ye Sofla, Yazd province, Iran
 Shahriyari, Kerman, Iran

People
 Majid Shahriari, Iranian nuclear engineer (1966 – 2010)
 Hamid Shahriari The general secretary of The World Forum for Proximity of Islamic Schools of Thought
 Shahriar Shahriari (born 1956), Iranian-American mathematician